Gazmend Sinani (22 June 1991 – 23 June 2018) was a Kosovan professional basketball player who last played as a center for Leeds Force and the Kosovo national team.

Early life
Sinani was born in Pristina, SFR Yugoslavia to Kosovo Albanian parents from Podujevo and he carried Kosovan and Turkish passports.

Professional career

Return to Sigal Prishtina
Last season with Kosovo Basketball Superleague club Sigal Prishtina, where he won three trophies as winner of Kosovo Basketball Superleague, winner of Kosovo Cup and the winner of Balkan League. In the local league he averaged 6.0 points and 5.6 rebounds while in BIBL he had 1.3 points and 2.3 rebounds.

Bashkimi Prizren
On 11 September 2016, Sinani joined Kosovo Basketball Superleague side Bashkimi Prizren.

Muğla Ormanspor
On 3 November 2016, Sinani joined Turkish Basketball First League side Muğla Ormanspor.

Rahoveci
On 29 November 2017, Sinani joined Kosovo Basketball Superleague side Rahoveci.

Leeds Force
On 26 January 2018, Sinani moved for the first time outside the Balkans and joined British Basketball League side Leeds Force and signed a contract to end of 2017–18 season.

International career
Sinani was one of the first players of Kosovo. On 31 August 2016, he made his official debut with Kosovo in a EuroBasket 2017 qualification match against Slovenia.

Death
On 23 June 2018, one day after his 27th birthday, Sinani suffered serious injuries in a car accident in the early hours in Gjakova, which also injured three other players of Kosovo national team: Altin Morina, Fisnik Rugova and Granit Rugova, along with physiotherapist Kujtim Shala. Sinani died as a result of his injuries, but all others in the accident survived.

References

External links
Gazmend Sinani at EuroBasket.com
Gazmend Sinani at Basketligan

1991 births
2018 deaths
Kosovo Albanians
Sportspeople from Pristina
Centers (basketball)
Fenerbahçe men's basketball players
KB Prishtina players
Bashkimi Prizren players
Kosovan men's basketball players
Road incident deaths in Kosovo